This article details the Bradford Bulls rugby league football club's 2014 season, the 19th season of the Super League era.

Season Review

June 2013

The Bulls announced their first signing for the 2014 season in the form of Warrington Wolves props forward Gareth Carvell on a 2-year deal.

July 2013

Bradford signed winger Luke George and second rower Dale Ferguson from Huddersfield Giants. Both of these players signed 2-year deals with the club.

August 2013

The Bulls announced that Matty Blythe's loan deal would become permanent and signed him on a 3 Year Deal from Warrington Wolves. Also, Bradford signed young stand-off Lee Gaskell on a 2 Year Deal from St. Helens.

September 2013

It was revealed that centre Keith Lulia had signed a deal with Wests Tigers as he wanted to raise his newborn child in Australia. Also leaving the club is veteran Jamie Langley (the last remaining survivor of the 2005 squad), Langley's contract was not renewed by coach Francis Cummins and Langley signed with Hull Kingston Rovers. Promising young fullback Curtis Naughton also went to Australia as his mother was emigrating there so Naughton followed suit. Michael Platt's contract was also not renewed so he would be leaving the club as well.

October 2013

Two signings were revealed in October. The first being New Zealand centre Adam Henry from NRL champions Sydney Roosters. The second signing was Samoa forward Frank Winterstein on a 1-year deal from Widnes Vikings.

November 2013

The month started off bad for the Bulls as it was announced that  forward John Bateman was sold to Wigan Warriors for a 6 figure sum. Bateman would join the Super League champions on a 3-year deal. Co-captain Heath L'Estrange was released on compassionate grounds so he could return to Australia. Young centre Sam Wood signed a 3 Year Extension keeping him at Odsal until after the 2016 season. Winger Elliot Kear also signed a 1-year extension to his current contract.

December 2013

It was announced that the Bulls would play Hull F.C. in a pre-season friendly whilst the match against Dewsbury Rams would be moved to 26 January. The Bulls revealed that Matt Diskin would continue on as captain for the 2014 season. Luke Gale was announced as vice-captain for the season.

January 2014

Frank Winterstein left the Bulls to return home to Australia to pursue a career in rugby union. Bradford announced that they had recruited Warrington Wolves youngsters James Saltonstall, Joe Philbin and Tom Walker on short-term loan deals. The Bulls won their first pre-season match against Hull F.C. 30–18. Nick Scruton, Adrian Purtell, Danny Addy, Jamie Foster and new boy Adam Henry scored the tries whilst Foster converted all 5 goals. In the second pre-season friendly the Bulls fielded a team of academy players with a few first-team members, the youthful Bulls lost 38–4 to Dewsbury Rams with James Saltonstall scoring Bradford's only try.

February 2014

The Bulls finished pre-season with an embarrassing 66–10 loss to Castleford Tigers. Bradford's tries came from Elliot Kear and Nick Scruton with Jamie Foster converting one of the tries. The week after it was announced that James Saltonstall would stay at Odsal on another month's loan deal. Vice-captain Luke Gale signed an extension to his contract, keeping him at Bradford until the end of the 2016 season. In the week leading up to the first Super League game, new signing Gareth Carvell left the Bulls and joined former club Hull F.C. on a 1 Year Deal. In wake of this news, the Bulls signed Danny Bridge on a 1-month loan deal from Warrington Wolves. Just before the season kicked off last year's top try scorer Jarrod Sammut departed the Bulls and joined Wakefield Trinity Wildcats on a 2 Year Deal. The opening day of the season did not go well for the Bulls as they lost 36–18 to Castleford Tigers. Danny Addy, Jamie Foster and Adrian Purtell scored for the Bulls whilst Foster kicked 3 goals. It was announced that Anthony Mullally would join on a 1-month loan from Huddersfield Giants. The Bulls got their first win of the campaign as they beat Wakefield Trinity Wildcats 23–10. The tries came from Adrian Purtell, Brett Kearney, Luke George and Adam O'Brien. Jamie Foster kicked 3 goals whilst Luke Gale slotted over a drop goal to give Bradford the win.

March 2014

Bradford went into administration again as potential buyers backed out following the 6-point deduction to the Bulls. During administration, Nick Scruton was sold to Wakefield Trinity Wildcats on a 1 Year Deal. The Bulls reduced their points deduction to minus 2 with a well earned 25–12 win against London Broncos. Luke Gale, Adam Sidlow, Danny Addy and Tom Olbison scored the tries whilst Jamie Foster kicked 4 goals and Gale added a drop goal. Bradford signed Leeds Rhinos halfback Liam Sutcliffe on a 1-month loan. They also brought in Wigan Warriors forward Greg Burke on a 1-month loan deal. Bradford lost to Hull F.C. 44–16 the following weekend with tries coming from Matt Diskin, Adrian Purtell and Adam Henry with Foster kicking 2 goals. The next game wasn't much better as the Bulls were reduced to 1 prop following injuries to Sidlow and Burke and Anthony Mullally being ineligible to play against Huddersfield Giants. The depleted Bulls lost 66–18 with Henry scoring 2 tries and Adam O'Brien also scoring, Foster converted 3 goals. Mullally's loan stay was extended until the end of the season. Bradford's season got worse as they lost 16–0 to Hull Kingston Rovers before losing the last March game 22–18 to Widnes Vikings, Liam Sutcliffe, Brett Kearney and Elliot Kear all scored while Luke Gale kicked 3 goals. The Bulls were taken over by Marc Green at the end of March.

April 2014

The Bulls announced their first signing since the ownership change of the club and it was Jamal Fakir the ex-Catalan prop who joined the club until the end of the season. The Bulls progressed to the next round of the Challenge Cup with a comprehensive 60–6 victory over Oldham. Luke Gale scored a hat-trick while Elliot Kear grabbed a brace. Brett Kearney, Adam O'Brien, Danny Addy, Adam Henry, Jamie Foster and Dale Ferguson also scored, Gale kicked 8 conversions. The following week the Bulls went down 38–24 to Salford Red Devils with Rangi Chase proving the difference between the two sides. Adrian Purtell, Adam Sidlow, Kear and Henry all scored and Foster kicked 4 goals. The derby game against Leeds Rhinos followed with Lee Gaskell scoring a try and Gale kicking the goal in Bradford's 46–6 loss. The final league game in April proved to be Bradford's biggest ever loss in Super League as they were beaten 84-6 by Wigan Warriors, Gale scored all 6 points. Jay Pitts and Joe Arundel signed for the Bulls on loan for the rest of the season. April ended on a high for Bradford as they came back from 16-0 down to beat Catalans Dragons 33–20 in the Challenge Cup. Foster grabbed a couple of tries whilst Gaskell, Gale and Purtell also scored, Foster, kicked 6 goals and Gale slotted a drop goal.

May 2014

Antonio Kaufusi joined the Bulls on a one-month loan from Huddersfield Giants. The win in the cup revitalised the Bulls as they beat Warrington Wolves 34–28 in their next league match. Adrian Purtell scored two tries whilst Jamie Foster, Brett Kearney, Tom Olbison and Elliot Kear also scored, Foster slotted 5 goals to ensure the Bulls won for the first time in 7 league games. However, they were brought crashing down to earth as St Helens R.F.C. were rampant and hammered Bradford 50–0. The Magic Weekend proved yet again too hard of a task for the Bulls as they were dispatched 54-16 by Huddersfield Giants, Danny Addy scored a try and Foster grabbed 2 and kicked 2 goals. Leeds Rhinos re-signed and then loaned youngsters Jordan Baldwinson and Mason Tonks to the Bulls. The following week the Catalans Dragons gained revenge for their cup exit as they beat the Bulls 46–4, Foster scored Bradford's only points.

June 2014

2014 Milestones

Round 1: Adam Henry, Lee Gaskell and Danny Bridge made their debuts for the Bulls.
Round 1: Nick Scruton made his 100th appearance for the Bulls.
Round 1: Manase Manuokafoa made his 50th appearance for the Bulls.
Round 2: Luke George and Anthony Mullally made their debuts for the Bulls.
Round 2: Luke George scored his 1st try for the Bulls.
Round 4: Greg Burke and Liam Sutcliffe made their debuts for the Bulls.
Round 4: Adam Henry scored his 1st try for the Bulls.
Round 7: Liam Sutcliffe scored his 1st try for the Bulls.
CCR4: Jamal Fakir and Dale Ferguson made their debut for the Bulls.
CCR4: Dale Ferguson scored his 1st try for the Bulls.
CCR4: Luke Gale scored his 1st hat-trick try for the Bulls.
CCR4: Luke Gale reached 200 points for the Bulls.
Round 8: Jamie Foster reached 200 points for the Bulls.
Round 9: Brett Kearney made his 100th appearance for the Bulls.
Round 9: Lee Gaskell scored his 1st try for the Bulls.
Round 10: Sam Bates made his debut for the Bulls.
CCR5: Jay Pitts made his debut for the Bulls.
Round 11: Joe Arundel and Antonio Kaufusi made their debut for the Bulls.
Round 12: Elliot Kear made his 50th appearance for the Bulls.
Round 13: Jamie Foster kicked his 100th goal for the Bulls.
Round 14: Jordan Baldwinson made his debut for the Bulls.
Round 14: Luke Gale made his 50th appearance for the Bulls.
Round 18: Adrian Purtell made his 50th appearance for the Bulls.
Round 18: Luke Gale kicked his 100th goal for the Bulls.
Round 18: Jay Pitts scored his 1st try for the Bulls.
Round 19: Danny Williams made his debut for the Bulls.
Round 19: Jamal Fakir scored his 1st try for the Bulls.
Round 20: Joe Arundel scored his 1st try for the Bulls.
Round 22: Danny Williams scored his 1st try for the Bulls.
Round 25: Lee Gaskell scored his 1st hat-trick for the Bulls.
Round 26: Brad Adams made his debut for the Bulls.
Round 26: Luke Gale reached 300 points for the Bulls.
Round 27: Emmerson Whittel made his debut for the Bulls.
Round 27: Luke Gale scored his 1st four-try haul and 2nd hat-trick for the Bulls.

Pre Season Friendlies

Bulls score is first.

Player Appearances
Friendly Games Only

 = Injured

 = Suspended

Table

2014 Fixtures and Results

2014 First Utility Super League

Player Appearances
Super League Only

 = Injured

 = Suspended

Challenge Cup

Player Appearances
Challenge Cup Games only

2014 Squad Statistics

 Appearances and Points include (Super League, Challenge Cup and Play-offs) as of 13 September 2014.

 = Injured
 = Suspended

2014 Transfers In/Out

In

Out

References

External links
Bradford Bulls Website
Bradford Bulls in T&A
Bradford Bulls on Sky Sports
Bradford on Super League Site
Red,Black And Amber
BBC Sport-Rugby League 

Bradford Bulls seasons
Bradford Bulls